Cemetech  is a programming and hardware development group and developer community founded in 2000.  Its primary software focus is calculator programming for TI and Casio graphing calculators, and its primary hardware focus is on mobile and wearable computing hardware.  Among its most notable projects are the Doors CS shell for the TI-83+ series of graphing calculators, the Clove 2 dataglove, the Ultimate Calculator, and the CALCnet / globalCALCnet system for networking graphing calculators and connecting them to the Internet.  The Cemetech website hosts tools for calculator programmers, including the SourceCoder TI-BASIC IDE and the jsTIfied TI-83+/84+ emulator. The founder of the site, Dr. Christopher Mitchell ("Kerm Martian"), began the site to showcase his personal projects, but since its early days, it has branched out to become one of the several major sites of the TI calculator hobbyist community and a source for hardware and programming development assistance.  It has incubated many software and hardware projects beginning in the calculator community at its roots but including microprocessor development, general electrical engineering, desktop applications, and mobile/web applications.

History 
Cemetech began as a personal website hosted on Homestead and later GeoCities, publishing personal software and hardware projects.  In 2004 the site expanded on shared hosting with a PhpBB-based forum, and in March 2005 moved to Cemetech.net.  The site spent the following three years consolidating its presence in the TI graphing calculator enthusiast community, attracting programmers who began publishing their own independent software projects on the site.  Early projects were primarily calculator-related, later branching out into computer, web, and embedded programming.  In mid-2006, Cemetech lost several hundred posts when hosting provider Jatol disappeared overnight, stranding hundreds of customers without websites or backups.  From 2008, Cemetech expanded further into hardware development, releasing popular projects such as the Clove 2 typing glove, an electro-acoustic musical instrument, and several hardware mods of graphing calculators.  Major software projects have included networking libraries for calculators and other low-resource devices, as well as the hardware and computer software to support internet-connected calculators, an extensive shell called Doors CS for these devices, and work on distributed computing and image processing projects by the founder and several staff members. In 2012, Cemetech's founder published a book called "Programming the TI-83 Plus/TI-84 Plus" which was published by Manning Publications, an introductory programming book inspired by his experiences working with beginner programmers at Cemetech.

Projects 
The following Cemetech projects have been widely disseminated on technology news sites and blogs, organized alphabetically.
 Clove 2: A Bluetooth data glove for one-handed typing.
 Doors CS: A calculator shell for the TI-83+/TI-84+ series of graphing calculators, offering a GUI API, a networking stack, and features for users and developers.
 Floppy Drive Music on a TI-83+: A twist on the classic project of using the stepper motors and coils in old hardware such as hard drives or floppy drives to make sound or music.  This version uses a calculator as the controller, utilizing its two I/O lines to control the floppy drive.
 gCn (globalCALCnet) and CALCnet: A linking protocol for linking the TI-83+ series of graphing calculators over the internet, or to each other.  Some applications include a chat client that can link calculators to each other and to IRC as well as a scorched-earth genre multiplayer game called Obliterate. Another famous usage of gCn is the Gossamer web browser, a version of the Lynx web browser.
 Gossamer: A web browser for graphing calculators, operating over the CALCnet and globalCALCnet networking protocols, allowing viewing of and interaction with simplified web pages.  A remote bridge based around the Lynx text-only web browser reformats web pages for use on the calculators.
jsTIfied: An online emulator for TI-73, TI-76.fr, TI-81, TI-82, TI-82 Stats.fr, TI-83, TI-83+, TI-83+SE, TI-84+ and TI-84+SE.
 Multichord: An electro-acoustic musical instrument using a hard drive to tension a string that can be strummed or plucked.
 SourceCoder: An online IDE for the TI-BASIC programming language, as well as the Z80 and eZ80 Assembly languages. It also has support for user-developed languages like C and ICE (developed primarily by Cemetech users MateoConLechuga and PT_ respectively)
 Ultimate Calculator: A project involving fully customizing the hardware of a TI-83+; this includes customization of the casing, adding a PS/2 mouse port, and at one point, even incorporating a PS/2 touchpad.  There have been three incarnations of the Ultimate Calculator.
Cemetech's many other past and present projects include web applications for trend aggregation and data mining, hardware and software projects for music visualization, many TI-BASIC and z80 Assembly programs, and research into parallelization, distributed computing, and image processing.

Awards and Media Attention 
The projects above have individually gained attention from being featured on technology and DIY websites and blogs. Cemetech as a whole has gained more limited notoriety. It is well known in the hobbyist graphing calculator programming scene, and began to gain more widespread attention with its booth at World Maker Faire 2012 in New York City, entitled "Hacking Graphing Calculators: The Stealth Pocket Computer". Cemetech's founder was interviewed, and the booth won the Faire's Educators' Choice Award. Cemetech returned to Maker Faire with new projects and references in 2013 and won the Editors' Choice Award as well as a second consecutive Educators' Choice Award.

Cemetech and Color Graphing Calculators 
In November 2012, Cemetech became one of the primary news sources introducing TI's new TI-84 Plus C Silver Edition, TI-84 Plus CE and Casio's fx-CP400 graphing calculators. Both devices were released in Q2 2013, and brought large color screens to their respective models. Cemetech's revelations about the two devices were widely quoted by popular online technology news outlets.

Controversy and Criticism 

Early in its history, Cemetech became embroiled in drama, disrupting the Texas Instruments calculator hobbyist scene, partly stemming from a premature announcement of the Doors CS project.  Various community members spoofed user accounts in an attempt to further discredit Cemetech.  Cemetech's growth and gradual gain in reputation resolved these initial bumps but in recent years have introduced a tension between the site and fellow community site Omnimaga, occasionally spawning backlash from one or both sites.  In early 2011, Cemetech's members took a vocal stand against Texas Instruments' educational division for the TI-Nspire CX graphing calculator to be introduced in Spring 2011, calling on community members to "ignore the Nspire CX and get a [...] Prizm" from TI competitor Casio.  While much of the hobbyist community agreed with the letter or spirit of the proclamation, a discussion between teachers and community members on a semi-official TI-Nspire discussion group prompted criticism of Cemetech's attitude as contrary to the purpose of TI's calculators, exemplified in "[o]ne thing that [...] is NOT wrong is TI's refusal to make the NSpire a platform for Doom or Quake or any other distraction that kids enjoy.  These things may be fun, but they aren't about learning math".

References

External links 
 Cemetech - The Cemetech website
 Cemetech's programs on ticalc.org

Ubiquitous computing
Internet forums
Community websites